The Adab Educational Complex ( موقوفه ی فرهنگی ادب) is a private school in the Lavizan neighborhood of Tehran, Iran.

History
The Adab school was founded in 1982 by G.R. Tanhaa, Moghaddasin, H. Rabbani Shirdel and Mortazavi. In 2009 a team of new teachers and presidents (from Soroush High School) entered.

Campus
The campus of Adab is located on Lavizan (called Louisiana by many of the students), on the east side of Tehran, Iran. The campus consists of three main buildings:
  School building
  Playground
 Extracurricular-dedicated (ادب پس از مدرسه)

School building
The school building of Adab is the oldest and largest building of the campus. It is located on the south of the campus and is divided into three sub-buildings. The sub-buildings are:
  Middle school
  Elementary school
  High school
All of the sub-buildings have three floors above-ground and one shared basement. The basement is used as a cafeteria by all the schools of Adab. Each sub-building has its own gate, and there is one shared gate leading to either a hallway with access to all buildings or the parking lot of Adab (placed under ground).

The playground
The playground is an asphalt-covered ground with a roof yet open-air. It is mainly used by the pre-school and elementary school students of Adab. It is placed on the northeast corner of the campus.

Extracurricular-dedicated
The extracurricular-dedicated building of Adab is located on the northwest of the campus. It is called "Adab pas az madrese (ادب پس از مدرسه)" which means "Adab post school" in Persian. The building has four floors:
  Groundfloor: Office and Security room
  1st floor: Library and Gamenet
  2nd floor: Studyroom and Lab
  3rd floor: Gym

Age IX
The 9th set of students entered highschool are known as "age IX" (2007–2011) (Persian: "دوره نهم").

References

External links 
 Adab Educational Complex

Educational institutions established in 1982
High schools in Iran
Schools in Tehran
1982 establishments in Iran